Engelbrecht "Brecht" Rodenburg (born 24 December 1967 in Nieuwerkerk aan den IJssel, South Holland) is a retired volleyball player from the Netherlands, who represented his native country at the 1996 Summer Olympics in Atlanta, Georgia. There he won the gold medal with the Dutch Men's National Team by defeating archrivals Italy in the final (3-2).

References
 Brecht Rodenburg at Olympic.org

1967 births
Living people
Dutch men's volleyball players
Olympic gold medalists for the Netherlands
Olympic medalists in volleyball
Olympic volleyball players of the Netherlands
People from Nieuwerkerk aan den IJssel
Volleyball players at the 1996 Summer Olympics
Medalists at the 1996 Summer Olympics
Sportspeople from South Holland
20th-century Dutch people